Cabinet Gorge Dam is a concrete gravity-arch hydroelectric dam in the northwest United States, on the Clark Fork River in northern Idaho.  The dam is located just west of the Montana border and the Cabinet Gorge Reservoir extends into Montana, nearly to Noxon Rapids Dam. The purpose of the dam is for hydroelectricity.

Construction

Construction began in 1951 by the Morrison–Knudsen Corporation, with groundbreaking ceremonies on April 1.

The Clark Fork River had to be diverted with two coffer dams and speed was necessary because spring flooding threatened the river diversion and coffer dam integrity. Thirty-two tons of dynamite was used to blast  of rock from the canyon walls in order to prep the construction site. Construction on the dam was completed in 1952 in half the estimated time.

The dam is currently owned and operated by the power company Avista, formerly Washington Water Power.

On August 13, 2017, a train derailment dumped more than 3,500 tons of coal on the Cabinet Gorge Reservoir riverbank between Noxon and Heron, Montana.

See also

List of dams in the Columbia River watershed

References

External links

Buildings and structures in Bonner County, Idaho
Dams in Idaho
United States power company dams
Hydroelectric power plants in Idaho
Arch-gravity dams
Dams completed in 1952
Dams on the Clark Fork
Energy infrastructure completed in 1952
Historic American Engineering Record in Idaho